Streptomyces muensis is a bacterium species from the genus of Streptomyces which has been isolated from a limestone quarry from Tangkhul Hundung in Manipur in India.

See also 
 List of Streptomyces species

References

Further reading

External links
Type strain of Streptomyces muensis at BacDive -  the Bacterial Diversity Metadatabase

muensis
Bacteria described in 2014